Trifolium buckwestiorum is a rare species of clover known by the common name Santa Cruz clover.

Distribution
It is endemic to California, where it is known from nine or ten small occurrences in Monterey, Santa Cruz, and Sonoma Counties. It may also occur in San Mateo, Santa Clara, and Mendocino Counties, but its populations are very small and easily disturbed by threats such as vehicles, development, and feral pig activity.

It grows in forest, woodland, and coastal prairie habitat.

Description
It is an annual herb growing upright or decumbent in form, with hairless green or reddish herbage. The leaves are made up of finely toothed, oval shaped leaflets up to 1.5 centimeters long and bristle-tipped stipules.

The inflorescence is a head of flowers roughly a centimeter wide, the flowers held in a bowl-like involucre of wide, jagged-toothed bracts. Each flower has a calyx of sepals that narrow into fine bristles and a pink corolla under one centimeter long.

References

Further reading
Isley, D. (1992). Innovations in California Trifolium and Lathyrus. Madroño 39(2):90–97.

External links
Jepson Manual Treatment
Photo gallery

buckwestiorum
Endemic flora of California
Natural history of the California chaparral and woodlands
Natural history of the California Coast Ranges
Natural history of the San Francisco Bay Area
Plants described in 1992
Critically endangered flora of California